Eugenia brasiliensis, with common names Brazil cherry and grumichama, or the Brazilian cherry is medium-sized tree (maximum 20 meters height) endemic (native) to southern Brazil which bears small fruits that are purple to black in color, and have a sweet cherry to plum-like flavor.  

It's a small size tree which makes it perfect to use in urban landscaping. Its slow growth and low rate of dispersal make it rare, and it is generally considered as an endangered species.

The inner flesh of the fruit is white yellowish in appearance, it's mostly used for fresh eating but can also be used in making jams, jellies and pies.

Gallery

References

External links
Grumichama – Fruits of Warm Climates
Grumichama – Trade Winds Fruit

Eugenia
Trees of Brazil